Chibuto District is a district of Gaza Province in south-western Mozambique. Its principal town is Chibuto. The district is located at the south of the province, and borders with Chigubo District in the north, Panda District of Inhambane Province in the east, Manjacaze District in the southeast, Xai-Xai District in the south, Chókwè District in the southwest, and Guijá District in the west. It has a population of 197,214 as of 2007.

Geography
The Changane River, a major left tributary of the Limpopo River, makes a border of the district with Inhambane Province. The area of the district belongs to the drainage basin of the Limpopo, though rivers in the interior are seasonal.

Demographics
As of 2005, 43% of the population of the district was younger than 15 years. 37% of the population spoke Portuguese. The most common mothertongue among the population was Tsonga. 54% were analphabetic, mostly women.

Administrative divisions
The district is divided into six postos, Chibuto (two localities), Alto Changane (two localities),  Godide (two localities), Malehice (six localities), Chaimite (three localities), and Changanine (two localities).

Economy
3% of the households in the district have access to electricity.

Agriculture
In the district, there are 33,000 farms which have on average  of land. The main agricultural products are corn, cassava, cowpea, peanut, sweet potato, and rice. Population of cattle, pigs, sheep, and goats was steadily growing prior to 2005.

Transportation

References

 
Districts in Gaza Province